Alexander Maconochie may refer to:

Alexander Maconochie, Lord Meadowbank (1777–1861)
Alexander Maconochie (penal reformer) (1787–1860)
Alexander Maconochie Centre, the gaol in the Australian Capital Territory

See also
Alexander Mackonochie